Gilles De Rocco (born 7 March 1957 in Dijon) is a French former professional football goalkeeper. He played with Olympique Lyonnais from 1975 to 1981, notably appearing in the 1976 Coupe de France Final.

Player career 
 1974-1975 : Beaune
 1975-1981 : Olympique lyonnais
 1981-1982 : USL Dunkerque (D2)
 1982-1987 : Thonon
 1987-1990 : AS Red Star

Coach career 
 2000-2003 : Ain Sud Foot

See also 
 List of Olympique Lyonnais players
 1976 Coupe de France Final

References

External links
 

1957 births
Living people
French footballers
French football managers
Association football goalkeepers
Olympique Lyonnais players
Ain Sud managers
French people of Italian descent
USL Dunkerque players
Olympique Thonon Chablais players
Red Star F.C. players
Ligue 1 players
Ligue 2 players
Sportspeople from Dijon
Footballers from Bourgogne-Franche-Comté